Jack William Hester (June 22, 1929 – April 29, 1999) was an American farmer and politician who served as a member of the Iowa Senate from 1979 to 1993.

Early life and education 
Born in Modale, Iowa, Hester graduated from Persia High School in Persia, Iowa in 1947. He served in the United States Air Force during the Korean War.

Career 
Hester worked as a farmer and livestock dealer. Hester served in the Iowa State Senate from 1979 to 1995 and was a Republican. He lived in Honey Creek, Pottawattamie County, Iowa. His wife Joan Hester also served in the Iowa General Assembly.

Notes

1929 births
1999 deaths
People from Harrison County, Iowa
People from Pottawattamie County, Iowa
Farmers from Iowa
Republican Party Iowa state senators
20th-century American politicians